Mukesh Patel School of Technology Management & Engineering (MPSTME) is a constituent school of SVKM's NMIMS. It was established in 2006 and has other campuses located in Shirpur, Navi Mumbai, and Indore.

Courses 
Bachelor of Technology Computer Science and Business Systems (B.Tech CSBS)
Bachelor of Technology (B.Tech.) 
Bachelor of Technology Integrated (Diploma & Degree)
Master of Business Administration (Technology) [Dual Degree B.Tech. and MBA (Tech.)]
PGDM – Real Estate Construction & Management
Master of Computer Applications (MCA)
Master of Technology (M.Tech.) 
Ph.D. (Engineering and Technology Management)

College Fest
Every year the institute organises festivals such as Conquer (Sports), Sattva (Cultural) and Taqneeq (Technical) and also organises various social events; along with various intra college events throughout the academic year.

The institute also has a thriving Model UN community and consequently, one of the largest Model UN conferences in India, MumbaiMUN, is organised by MUNSociety MPSTME. 

Universities and colleges in Mumbai